Harold Harrison (December 31, 1872 – January 23, 1953) was an American businessman and politician.

Harrison was born in Montclair, New Jersey, and graduated from Stevens Institute of Technology, in Hoboken, New Jersey, in 1902 with a degree in mechanical engineering. He moved to Minneapolis, Minnesota in 1905 with his wife and family and was involved with the insurance and real estate businesses. Harrison served in the Minnesota House of Representatives from 1937 to 1940 and in the Minnesota Senate from 1941 to 1950.

References

1872 births
1953 deaths
People from Montclair, New Jersey
Businesspeople from Minneapolis
Politicians from Minneapolis
Stevens Institute of Technology alumni
Members of the Minnesota House of Representatives
Minnesota state senators